Mechanicsburg is an unincorporated community in Auburn Township, Crawford County, Ohio, United States.

History
Mechanicsburg was founded circa 1845 and was so named because many of its original inhabitants had the occupation of mechanic, such as blacksmith, carpenter and cooper.

References

Populated places in Crawford County, Ohio